Zsolt Venczel (born 25 November 2002) is a Hungarian professional footballer who plays for Kápolnásnyék.

Career statistics
.

References

2002 births
Footballers from Budapest
Living people
Hungarian footballers
Association football defenders
Budafoki LC footballers
Nemzeti Bajnokság I players